"Don't Make Me" is  a song recorded by American country music singer Blake Shelton. It was released in November 2006 as the first single from his album, Pure BS. It was written by Marla Cannon-Goodman, Deanna Bryant, and Dave Berg.

Content
This song is about a man who notices a change in his girlfriend's behavior and is begging for the relationship to be righted. He tells her that he doesn't want to leave, but if that's what it comes to, he will and he won't be back.

Music video
The music video was directed by Roman White and premiered in November 2006.

Chart performance
The song debuted at #60 on the Hot Country Songs chart dated November 11, 2006. It spent 31 weeks on that chart, and peaked at #12 on the chart dated June 9, 2007, in addition to peaking at #79 on the Billboard Hot 100.

Year-end charts

References

2006 singles
Blake Shelton songs
Music videos directed by Roman White
Songs written by Dave Berg (songwriter)
Songs written by Deanna Bryant
Songs written by Marla Cannon-Goodman
Warner Records Nashville singles
Country ballads
Song recordings produced by Brent Rowan
2006 songs